Robert Schürch (18 November 1895, Aarau – 14 May 1941, Ascona) was a Swiss Expressionist painter and graphic artist, whose work is mostly grotesque or satirical; consisting largely of drawings. As a young man, he took Johann (or Johannes) as his first name to honor his father.

Biography 
His father, Johann, operated a printing plant and his mother, Anna, was a teacher. In 1907, his father died, followed shortly by both of his sisters, who died of tuberculosis. His mother took him to Zürich, where he received training as a poster artist and took drawing lessons from the landscape painter,  in nearby Zollikon. In 1914, he was drafted into the reserves.

In 1916, his mother sent some of his drawings to Ferdinand Hodler, who advised them to come to Geneva, which they did. After work at the École des Beaux-Arts, he studied with Eugène Gilliard (1861–1921) at his private school, then took a position in Hodler's studio as his assistant. When Hodler died in 1918, Schürch painted him on his deathbed.

In 1921, he received a stipendium from a charitable fund overseen by the Zürcher Kunstgesellschaft (Artists' association) that enabled him to study in Florence, where he became acquainted with Max Gubler and copied the Old Masters. By 1922, however, he had come to find life there too stressful and confusing, so he moved to Ticino and lived with his mother in a small chalet in Monti, near Locarno. 

He became isolated there and earned little from his work, so his mother supported them by writing pieces for various periodicals. He was there until 1932, when he broke away from his mother; spending time at small cabins in Minusio and Brione and making friends in the artistic community. In 1933, he was in a serious automobile accident that left his health impaired. The following year, he settled in Ascona, with his partner, Erica Leutwyler and took part in the cultural activities at Monte Verità.

In 1939, his mother died and, the following year, he was drafted into the Grenzdienst (Border Patrol). While serving, he became seriously ill and was discharged. He died of advanced tuberculosis in 1941, at his home in Ascona.

The largest collection of his works may be seen at the Kunsthaus Zürich.

Selected works

Further reading 
 Johannes Robert Schürch: Tambour Macabre. Zeichnungen Limmat Verlag, Zürich 1990, .
 Zeichnungen / Johannes Robert Schürch. commentary by Dieter Roth. Ed. by Erica Ebinger-Leutwyler. Lucerne 2001, . 
 Johannes Robert Schürch: Aquarelle/Gouachen. Ed. by Erica Ebinger-Leutwyler. Lucerne 2008, .

External links 

 
 
More works by Schürch @ ArtNet

1895 births
1941 deaths
Swiss painters
Expressionist painters
20th-century deaths from tuberculosis
Swiss illustrators
Swiss artists
Tuberculosis deaths in Switzerland
20th-century Swiss military personnel